Meschede is a town in the Hochsauerland district, in North Rhine-Westphalia, Germany. It is the capital of the district Hochsauerlandkreis.

Education

One of the five branches of South Westphalia University of Applied Sciences (also: Fachhochschule Südwestfalen (FH SWF)) is located here.

Geography
Meschede is situated in the Ruhr valley, near to the Hennesee, south of the nature-park Arnsberger Wald. Major towns in the vicinity of Meschede are Paderborn (51 km), Kassel (85 km), Siegen (57 km), Hagen, Dortmund (60 km) and Hamm (49 km).

Neighbouring municipalities 
 Arnsberg
 Bestwig
 Eslohe
 Schmallenberg
 Sundern
 Warstein

Division of the town 
After the local government reforms of 1975 Meschede consists of these districts and villages:

History
Meschede was founded as a settlement around a convent, the Walpurgis-Stift , in the 10th century. In 1572, it became a member of the Hanseatic League.

In the 18th century, many inhabitants of Meschede died in at least two epidemics of dysentery.

Both in World War I and in World War II, Meschede was notorious as a location where the Germans exploited POWs in  labour camps. In February, 1945, the town was destroyed by Allied air raid bombings, because of its strategically important railway station, but rebuilt after the war.

In 1921, the Sauerländer Heimatbund was founded.

In 1970, Meschede's St. Walberga Hospital was the site of a smallpox outbreak, as described in the book The Demon in the Freezer by Richard Preston.

Economy
Meschede is the seat of three major companies: 
 a department of Deutsche Telekom
 the Veltins Brewery
 the Honsel factory, founded in 1908, that produces car parts and other products from aluminum, owned by the Canadese company  Martinrea.

An industrial zone is located near the crossing of the A 46 with the B 55 (see below).

Tourism also is important to the town's economy.

Transportation

Meschede is connected with two national roads, the federal roads B 7 and B 55, and the motorway A 46.

Meschede has a railroad station, and is connected via the Sauerland Net, RB 57, to Arnsberg and other towns.

It has an airfield, the Meschede-Schüren Airfield, with a 900 m runway.

Climate

The city's climate is continental.

Culture
Spanish fricco is a traditional stew dish of Meschede.

Mayors of Meschede
1952–1961: Engelbert Dick (CDU)
1961–1969: Josef Busch (CDU)
1969–1974: Bruno Peus (CDU)
1975–1998: Franz Stahlmecke (CDU)
1998–1999: Bruno Peus (CDU)
1999–2015: Hans-Ulrich (Uli) Hess (CDU)
2015–present: Christoph Weber (CDU)

Notable people
Joseph Hippolyt Pulte (1811–1884), homeopathic physician 
August Macke (1887–1914), painter
Klaus-Jürgen Wrede (born 1963), board game creator, author of the Carcassonne
Matthias Ungemach (born 1968), rower, trained here

Main sights
Abbey Königsmünster, built by the Order of Saint Benedict.
Lake Hennesee near Meschede is the main recreational area of the town.

Twin towns – sister cities

Meschede is twinned with:
 Cousolre, France (1965)
 Le Puy-en-Velay, France (1975)

Meschede also has friendly relations with:
 Neufraunhofen, Germany

References

External links
 Official site 

Towns in North Rhine-Westphalia
Hochsauerlandkreis